Polia lamuta is a species of moth belonging to the family Noctuidae.

Synonym:
 Anarta lamuta Herz, 1903 (= basionym)

References

Noctuidae
Moths described in 1903